Robert Nichol is a Canadian cinematographer, director, and writer.

Filmography

External links
Robert Nichol
List of credits
 

Year of birth missing (living people)
Living people
Canadian cinematographers